Munich-Karlsfeld station is a railway station in the municipality of Karlsfeld, located in the district of Dachau in Upper Bavaria, Germany.

Location
The northern area of the station is located in the municipality of Karlsfeld and has an eastern access from the Wehrstaudenstrasse and a western access from the Bayernwerkstraße.

The southern area of the station is located in the city of Munich (borough Allach-Untermenzing) and has an eastern (Zum Schwabenbächl) and a western access (Eversbuschstraße).

References

External links

Munich S-Bahn stations
Railway stations in Bavaria
Railway stations in Germany opened in 1896
1896 establishments in Bavaria